The Pacific earwig (Anisolabis pacifica) is a species of earwig in the genus Anisolabis, the family Anisolabididae, the suborder Forficulina, and the order Dermaptera.

See also
 List of Dermapterans of Australia

References

Anisolabididae
Insects described in 1842